Verba Preston Carpenter (January 24, 1934 – June 30, 2011) was an American football player.  He played professionally as an end, halfback, tight end, and kick returner over eleven seasons for five different teams in the National Football League (NFL) and the American Football League (AFL).  Carpenter played college football at the University of Arkansas for the Razorbacks.

Family
Carpenter was born to Verba Glen Carpenter and Edna Earl Pullam in Hayti, Missouri. He graduated from Muskogee Central High School, where he was Oklahoma All State. His brother, Lew Carpenter, played and coached in the NFL for over forty years.

Carpenter married Jeanne Etychison (d. 2019).  The couple had three children: Scott, Bruce (d. 2015) and Lewis Todd Carpenter.  He is a descendant of Thomas "Jack" Carpenter (1740–1803).

College
At the University of Arkansas, Carpenter was an outstanding single-wing blocking back and linebacker for the Razorbacks in 1953 and 1954. In 1954, he caught a 66-yard touchdown pass against Ole Miss in one of the most famous plays in Razorbacks history. He was an All-Southwest Conference selection in 1955 as a halfback.

NFL football
Carpenter played 12 seasons in the NFL. He was a Pro Bowl selection as a Pittsburgh Steeler tight end in 1962. Carpenter also played for Miami, Washington and Minnesota.

Cleveland Browns
A first-round draft choice in 1956, Carpenter was selected by the reigning NFL champion Cleveland Browns, who picked thirteenth.  The Browns used him primarily as a halfback in his rookie year, when he gained 756 yards on 188 carries while averaging 25.4 yds/touch on 15 kickoff returns.  In 1957–1959, he was used mainly as a receiver, where in four years, he accrued 1,366 yards and five touchdowns. Carpenter led the Cleveland Browns in rushing in 1956 and receiving in 1958.

Pittsburgh Steelers
With the Pittsburgh Steelers, in his first year, he also averaged over 25 yards/touch on kickoff returns, and from 1960 through 1963 with Pittsburgh, he picked up another 1,680 yards and 11 touchdowns on receptions, making the NFL Pro Bowl in 1962.

Final pro years
From 1964 through 1966 with the Washington Redskins and Minnesota Vikings, Carpenter gained another 1,281 yards and seven touchdowns receiving.  He completed his pro football career with the American Football League's Miami Dolphins in 1967.  His career record includes a combined 6,253 receiving, rushing, and return yards, with a 25.9 yards/touch career average on kickoff returns, and a total of 24 touchdowns: 23 rushing and one receiving.

Honors
Carpenter was inducted into the Arkansas Sports Hall of Fame in 1992.
Carpenter was inducted into the University of Arkansas Sports Hall of Honor in 1996.
Carpenter also received The All-American Football Foundation’s All-American Football Legends Award on July 25, 2003.

See also

 List of American Football League players

References

External links
 

1934 births
2011 deaths
American football ends
American football halfbacks
American football tight ends
Arkansas Razorbacks football players
Cleveland Browns players
Miami Dolphins players
Minnesota Vikings players
Pittsburgh Steelers players
Washington Redskins players
Eastern Conference Pro Bowl players
Sportspeople from Muskogee, Oklahoma
People from Hayti, Missouri
Players of American football from Oklahoma
American Football League players